The slaty-capped flycatcher (Leptopogon superciliaris) is a small passerine bird in the tyrant flycatcher family. It is found in northern Bolivia to Costa Rica and in Trinidad.

Description
The head has a dark grey crown, grey and white face, grey supercilium, and black crescent-shaped ear patch. The upperparts are olive-green and the dusky wings have two yellowish wing bars. The throat is whitish and the breast is greenish yellow shading to yellow on the belly. The long heavy bill is black above and pink-based below. Sexes are similar, but young birds have a more olive crown, weaker face pattern, orange wing bars and paler underparts. They have a sharp switch-choo call.

Distribution and habitat
It breeds from Costa Rica through Colombia  and northern Venezuela to northern Bolivia,  Ecuador, and Peru. It also occurs on Trinidad. This species is found in forests and woodland edges.

Behaviour
Slaty-capped flycatcher are seen alone or in pairs, perched in the open or catching insects in flight or from foliage. They also frequently eat berries.

The nest is a ball lined with fine plant fibres, with a side entrance. It is suspended by a tendril or root and built in a heavily shaded area, such as a rock cleft or under hanging vegetation at the top of a bank. The typical clutch is two white eggs.

References

Further reading

slaty-capped flycatcher
Birds of Costa Rica
Birds of Panama
Birds of the Northern Andes
Birds of the Venezuelan Coastal Range
Birds of Trinidad and Tobago
slaty-capped flycatcher